In computational geometry, a well-separated pair decomposition (WSPD) of a set of points , is a sequence of pairs of sets , such that each pair is well-separated, and for each two distinct points , there exists precisely one pair which separates the two.

The graph induced by a well-separated pair decomposition can serve as a k-spanner of the complete Euclidean graph, and is useful in approximating solutions to several problems pertaining to this.

Definition 

Construction

Split tree 

By way of constructing a fair split tree, it is possible to construct a WSPD of size  in  time.

It is done recursively until there is only one point in the set.

Let  denote the size of the longest interval of the bounding hyperrectangle of point set  and let  denote the size of the i-th dimension of the bounding hyperrectangle of point set . We give pseudocode for the Split tree computation below.

 
     Let  be the node for 
     if 
          //  is a hyperrectangle which each side has a length of zero.
         Store in  the only point in S.
     else
         Compute 
         Let the i-th dimension be the one where 
         
         
         
     return 

This algorithm runs in  time.

We give  a more efficient algorithm that runs in  time below. The goal is to loop over the list in only  operations per step of the recursion but only call the recursion on at most half the points each time.

Let  be the i-th coordinate of the j-th point in  such that  is sorted according to the i-th coordinate and  be the point. Here is the algorithm in pseudo-code:

 
     if 
          //  is a hyperrectangle which each side has a length of zero.
     else
         
         repeat
             Compute 
             
             
             
             Let the i-th dimension be the one where 
             
             
             while  and 
                 
                 }
                 }
                 
                 
             
             if 
                 
                 
                 
                 
             else if 
                 
                 
                 
                 
         until 
         

To be able to maintain the sorted lists for each node, linked lists are used. Cross-pointers are kept for each list to the others to be able to retrieve a point in constant time. In the algorithm above, in each iteration of the loop, a call to the recursion is done. In reality, to be able to reconstruct the list without the overhead of resorting the points, it is necessary to rebuild the sorted lists once all points have been assigned to their nodes. To do the rebuilding, walk along each list for each dimension, add each point to the corresponding list of its nodes, and add cross-pointers in the original list to be able to add the cross-pointers for the new lists. Finally, call the recursion on each node and his set.

WSPD computation 

The WSPD can be extracted from such a split tree by calling the recursive  function on the children of every node in the split tree. Let  /  denote the children of the node . We give pseudocode for the  function below.

 FindWSPD(T, s)
     for each node u that is not a leaf in the split tree T do
         FindPairs(ul, ur)

We give pseudocode for the  function below.

 FindPairs(v, w)
         report 
     else
         if(  )
             Recursively call  and 
         else
             Recursively call  and 

Combining the -well-separated pairs from all the calls of  gives the WSPD for separation .

It is clear that the pairs returned by the algorithm are well-separated because of the return condition of the function .

Assume without loss of generality that (i) holds.

Each time the recursion tree split in two, there is one more pair added to the decomposition. So, the algorithm run-time is in the number of pairs in the final decomposition.

Callahan and Kosaraju proved that this algorithm finds a Well-separated pair decomposition (WSPD) of size .

Properties 

Then, .

We obtain that:

Then, .

Proof: By the triangle inequality, we have:

From Lemma 1, we obtain:

Applications 

The well-separated pair decomposition has application in solving a number of problems. WSPD can be used to:

 Solve the closest pair problem in  time.
 Solve the k-closest pairs problem in  time.
 Solve the k-closest pair problem in  time.
 Solve the all-nearest neighbors problem in  time.
 Provide a -approximation of the diameter of a point set in  time.
 Directly induce a t-spanner of a point set.
 Provide a t-approximation of the Euclidean minimum spanning tree in d dimensions in  time.
 Provide a -approximation of the Euclidean minimum spanning tree in d dimensions in  time.

References 

Computational geometry